Ireland entered the Eurovision Song Contest 1980, sending Johnny Logan to the contest with the song "What's Another Year", written by Shay Healy.

Before Eurovision

National final 
The Irish national final to select the Irish representative for the Eurovision Song Contest 1980, was held on 9 March 1980 at the RTÉ Studios in Dublin and was hosted by Larry Gogan. It was organised by the Irish broadcaster of the contest Raidió Teilifís Éireann (RTÉ).

Eight songs were performed live to the Irish viewers and listeners, with the winning song being decided by 10 regional juries across the country. The winner went on to win the Eurovision Song Contest in The Hague, which gave Ireland its second victory, ten years after its first.

At Eurovision 

The Eurovision Song Contest 1980 was held at the Congresgebouw in The Hague, Netherlands. Ireland performed 17th on the night of the contest, following France and preceding Spain. Logan received 143 points for his performance, winning the contest for Ireland.

Voting

Congratulations: 50 Years of the Eurovision Song Contest

Among "What's Another Year"'s future honours as a Eurovision evergreen was its inclusion as one of the fourteen competing songs in Congratulations, Eurovision's fiftieth anniversary contest special. It was one of two Irish entries competing to be named the best Eurovision entry of all time, the other being Logan's subsequent winner, "Hold Me Now.". The song was performed second on the night, following the United Kingdom's Cliff Richard with "Congratulations" and preceding Israel's Dana International with "Diva." Unlike "Hold Me Now," "What's Another Year" failed to make it past the first round, finishing 12th with 74 points.

Voting

References

External links
 Irish National Final 1980 page

1980
Countries in the Eurovision Song Contest 1980
Eurovision
Eurovision